The Ghana Super Cup is a football competition involving a match played between the champion of the Ghana Premier League and the winner of the Ghanaian FA Cup in Ghana. The first Ghana Super Cup competition took place in the 1996–1997 season, after which there was a thirteen-year hiatus between the 1998 and 2010 seasons. Accra Hearts of Oak and Kumasi Asante Kotoko are the two most successful clubs in the competition's history.

The current cup holders are Accra Hearts of Oak, champions of both the 2020-21 Ghana Premier League and the 2021 Ghanaian FA Cup.

Winners

Top performing clubs

Notes and references

Football competitions in Ghana
National association football supercups
Football cup competitions in Ghana